Datuk Leong Mun Yee  (born 4 December 1984) is a Malaysian diver. She competed at the 2000, 2004, 2008 and 2012 Olympics with the best result of seventh place in the 10 m synchronised platform event in 2012. Her appearance at the 2008 Summer Olympics made her the first Malaysian diver to compete at three Olympics.  The bronze medal that she and Pandelela Rinong won at the 2009 World Championships was the first World Championship medal for Malaysia.

She was originally a swimmer but switched to diving at the age of 10 as part of Malaysia's programme to prepare a diving team for the 1998 Commonwealth Games. Leong announced her retirement on 5 January 2022.

She graduated from Universiti Putra Malaysia with a Bachelor of Communication in 2017 and a Master of Corporate Communication in 2022.

Honour
  :
  Knight Commander of the Order of the Territorial Crown (PMW) – Datuk (2022)

References

External links
 
 
 

1984 births
Living people
People from Ipoh
Malaysian sportspeople of Chinese descent
University of Putra Malaysia alumni
Divers at the 2000 Summer Olympics
Divers at the 2004 Summer Olympics
Divers at the 2008 Summer Olympics
Divers at the 2012 Summer Olympics
Divers at the 2020 Summer Olympics
Divers at the 2018 Commonwealth Games
Olympic divers of Malaysia
Malaysian female divers
Asian Games medalists in diving
Divers at the 2002 Asian Games
Divers at the 2006 Asian Games
Divers at the 2010 Asian Games
Divers at the 2014 Asian Games
Divers at the 2018 Asian Games
Divers at the 2014 Commonwealth Games
Asian Games silver medalists for Malaysia
Asian Games bronze medalists for Malaysia
Commonwealth Games silver medallists for Malaysia
World Aquatics Championships medalists in diving
Commonwealth Games medallists in diving
Medalists at the 2002 Asian Games
Medalists at the 2006 Asian Games
Medalists at the 2010 Asian Games
Medalists at the 2014 Asian Games
Medalists at the 2018 Asian Games
Universiade medalists in diving
Southeast Asian Games gold medalists for Malaysia
Southeast Asian Games silver medalists for Malaysia
Southeast Asian Games bronze medalists for Malaysia
Southeast Asian Games medalists in diving
Competitors at the 1999 Southeast Asian Games
Competitors at the 2001 Southeast Asian Games
Competitors at the 2003 Southeast Asian Games
Competitors at the 2005 Southeast Asian Games
Competitors at the 2007 Southeast Asian Games
Competitors at the 2009 Southeast Asian Games
Competitors at the 2011 Southeast Asian Games
Competitors at the 2013 Southeast Asian Games
Competitors at the 2015 Southeast Asian Games
Competitors at the 2017 Southeast Asian Games
Universiade bronze medalists for Malaysia
Medallists at the 2018 Commonwealth Games